Edgar Guerrero Gastelum (born October 23, 1979 in Burley, Idaho), lived in the Mexican state of Sinaloa until the age of 8. He and his family later moved to Glenns Ferry, Idaho. He is the son of Juan Guerrero and Dora Guerrero Gastelum. He graduated from Glenn’s Ferry High School and he graduated from Boise State University where he received a bachelor's degree in Graphic Design in 2004.

Before entering the popular Mexican show La Academia, an 'American Idol'-style TV show, 
he was a member of several music groups, most recently Grupo Karibe in Boise, which performs all styles of music in Spanish. He was working for a Boise Airport car rental company when he auditioned for the show in Los Angeles. He beat out 150,000 people from Mexico and the United States to become one of 18 contestants during the show's fourth season.

At the end he lost to Erasmo Catarino, a school teacher of indigenous ethnicity, He won fifth place of the fourth generation of the popular Mexican show La Academia.

On 24 September 2005, Edgar Guerrero traveled to Burley, Idaho, to receive the keys of the city for being a good ambassador of the community. The mayor John Anderson proclaimed 24 September "Edgar Guerrero Day"...

At this moment Edgar is working on many projects, he currently resides in Phoenix AZ, owns a marketing company called P.E.G. MPP, is the public image for many companies and works as a programmer and music consultant for 94.5 Exa FM, a radio station based in Las Vegas, Nevada.

Edgar has 3 children, Phoenix, Eros and Gael. Currently married to Slidayne Guerrero.

External links 
Edgar Guerrero Website - Official site
LaAcademia.tv - La Academia's official site
TVAzteca.com - TV Azteca, the TV station that produces La Academia

1979 births
Living people
La Academia contestants
People from Burley, Idaho
People from Glenns Ferry, Idaho